Big Horn County is a county in the U.S. state of Wyoming. As of the 2020 United States Census, the population was 11,521. The county seat is Basin. Its north boundary abuts the south boundary of Montana.

History
Big Horn County was created by the legislature of Wyoming Territory in March 1890, and was organized in 1897; its area was annexed from Fremont, Johnson, and Sheridan counties.  
Big Horn County was named for the Big Horn Mountains which form its eastern boundary. Originally, the county included the entire Big Horn Basin, but in 1909 Park County, WY was created from a portion of Big Horn County, and in 1911 Hot Springs and Washakie counties were created from portions of Big Horn, leaving the county with its present borders.
There were large amounts of first generation immigrants from England and Germany living in Big Horn County when World War I broke out in Europe.

The two groups went out of their way to maintain cordial relations with one another, and the county did not see the sorts of anti-German sentiment that was common throughout much of the country.  While the English residents were outspokenly pro-British, and many of their Wyoming-born sons went to Canada and joined the Canadian Armed Forces in order to serve in the war on England's side, they nonetheless made sure that their German co-workers and neighbors were not harassed or discriminated against.  In late 1917 one English rancher referred to the effort as making sure that his German neighbor was always "treated like a gentleman."  Another English rancher said that two of his ranch hands were from Germany and he "would hate to see the foolishness of national hatreds inflicted on men as decent as they are."  English residents of Big Horn County went out of their way to make sure that German-born residents did not feel unwelcome.  German immigrants and their Wyoming-born children were not "anti-British" though they favored America remaining neutral in the conflict.  Before the war the most commonly read works of fiction among German-born residents of Big Horn County were German language translations of British adventure stories including The Four Feathers by A. E. W. Mason as well as Sherlock Holmes stories and The Light That Failed by Rudyard Kipling.  Consensus among Big Horn County residents of all backgrounds after the war was that the war had ultimately been a tragedy and a "horrible waste of human life."

Geography

Adjacent counties

 Park County – west
 Carbon County, Montana – northwest
 Big Horn County, Montana – northeast
 Sheridan County – east
 Johnson County – southeast
 Washakie County – south

Big Horn County in Wyoming and Montana are one of ten pairs of counties and parishes in the United States with the same name to border each other across state lines. The others are Sabine (Texas and Louisiana), Union (Arkansas and Louisiana), Bristol (Massachusetts and Rhode Island), Kent (Maryland and Delaware), Escambia (Alabama and Florida), Pike (Illinois and Missouri), Teton (Idaho and Wyoming), Park (Montana and Wyoming), and San Juan (New Mexico and Utah - albeit through a single point, the four corners).

Major highways

  U.S. Highway 14
  U.S. Highway 14A
  U.S. Highway 16
  U.S. Highway 20
  U.S. Highway 310
  Wyoming Highway 30
  Wyoming Highway 31
  Wyoming Highway 32
  Wyoming Highway 114
  Wyoming Highway 37

National protected areas
 Bighorn Canyon National Recreation Area (part)
 Bighorn National Forest (part)

Demographics

2000 census
As of the 2000 United States Census, there were 11,461 people, 4,312 households, and 3,087 families in the county. The population density was 4 people per square mile (1/km2). There were 5,105 housing units at an average density of 2 per square mile (1/km2). The racial makeup of the county was 94.03% White, 0.11% Black or African American, 0.75% Native American, 0.21% Asian, 0.07% Pacific Islander, 3.37% from other races, and 1.46% from two or more races. 6.17% of the population were Hispanic or Latino of any race. 23.0% were of German, 21.4% English, 8.1% American and 8.0% Irish ancestry.

There were 4,312 households, out of which 32.50% had children under the age of 18 living with them, 61.00% were married couples living together, 6.80% had a female householder with no husband present, and 28.40% were non-families. 25.00% of all households were made up of individuals, and 11.90% had someone living alone who was 65 years of age or older. The average household size was 2.60 and the average family size was 3.13.

The county population contained 28.70% under the age of 18, 7.30% from 18 to 24, 22.60% from 25 to 44, 24.60% from 45 to 64, and 16.80% who were 65 years of age or older. The median age was 39 years. For every 100 females there were 100.20 males. For every 100 females age 18 and over, there were 97.10 males.

The median income for a household in the county was $32,682, and the median income for a family was $38,237. Males had a median income of $30,843 versus $19,489 for females. The per capita income for the county was $15,086.  About 10.20% of families and 14.10% of the population were below the poverty line, including 19.20% of those under age 18 and 10.00% of those age 65 or over.

2010 census
As of the 2010 United States Census, there were 11,668 people, 4,561 households, and 3,179 families in the county. The racial makeup of the county was 94.4% white, 0.9% American Indian, 0.3% Asian, 0.2% black or African American, 3.0% from other races, and 1.2% from two or more races. Those of Hispanic or Latino origin made up 8.4% of the population. In terms of ancestry, 30.0% were German, 22.3% were English, 10.4% were Irish, 7.6% were Scottish, and 5.7% were American.

Of the 4,561 households, 31.0% had children under the age of 18 living with them, 58.2% were married couples living together, 7.6% had a female householder with no husband present, 30.3% were non-families, and 26.2% of all households were made up of individuals. The average household size was 2.52 and the average family size was 3.05. The median age was 41.8 years.

The median income for a household in the county was $48,270 and the median income for a family was $57,705. Males had a median income of $40,762 versus $31,440 for females. The per capita income for the county was $24,486. About 5.7% of families and 8.9% of the population were below the poverty line, including 11.2% of those under age 18 and 7.1% of those age 65 or over.

Government and infrastructure
The Wyoming Department of Health Wyoming Retirement Center, a nursing home, is located in Basin. The facility was operated by the Wyoming Board of Charities and Reform until that agency was dissolved as a result of a state constitutional amendment passed in November 1990.

Big Horn County voters have been reliably Republican for decades. They have selected the Republican Party candidate in every national election except one since 1936 (as of 2020).

Education
Big Horn County has four public school districts, Big Horn County School Districts 1-4:

Communities

Towns

 Basin (county seat)
 Burlington
 Byron
 Cowley
 Deaver
 Frannie (partly in Park County)
 Greybull
 Lovell
 Manderson

Census-designated places
 Hyattville
 Shell

Unincorporated communities

 Emblem
 Kane
 Otto
 Meadow Lark Lake
 Reeves Corner

See also
 National Register of Historic Places listings in Big Horn County, Wyoming
Wyoming
List of cities and towns in Wyoming
List of counties in Wyoming
Wyoming statistical areas

References

External links

 County website
 Big Horn County, Wyoming Sheriff's Office

 
1897 establishments in Wyoming
Populated places established in 1897